Kevin Keathley is a basketball coach and author who is the Director of Player Personnel/Assistant Coach for the Shreveport Mavericks for the 2021 season.

Coaching career

Lees College
Keathley began his career as an assistant coach at Lees College in his home state of Kentucky. He served as the Lees College top assistant and later interim head coach.

Saint Catharine College
Following his stint at Lees, Keathley joined the coaching staff at Saint Catharine College, where the Patriots averaged 95.6 points per game in 2002.

Louisville Eagles (UPBL)
After two years at Saint Catharine, Keathley was named Associate Coach for the Louisville Eagles of the UPBL. In 2003, the Louisville Eagles won the UPBL championship.

Kentucky Colonels (ABA)
In 2004 Keathley was named head coach of the ABA's Kentucky Colonels. The Keathley-coached Colonels finished the 2005 season 21–12, falling to eventual champion Arkansas in the second round of the playoffs. In 2005 Keathley was named ABA (American Basketball Association) Coach of the Year as the coach of the Kentucky Colonels. At the time he was the youngest coach in all of pro basketball. The following year, he was named one of the top ten young coaches in America by Probasketballnews.com.

Rio-Grande Valley Silverados
On leaving the Kentucky Colonels in 2006, Keathley spent one season as the head assistant coach for the Rio-Grande Valley Silverados, also in the ABA and CBA.

East Kentucky Miners (CBA)
Keathley served as the head coach of the East Kentucky Miners, a professional team in the CBA from 2007 through the 2009 seasons. The East Kentucky Miners led the league in scoring both seasons. In 2009, Kevin Keathley was named one of the top 10 Coaches not in the NBA www.probasketballnews.com

South East Texas Mavericks (ABA)
During the 2009–2010 season Keathley would serve as associate head coach for the South East Texas Mavericks located in Beaumont, Texas. Kevin Keathley would win the 2010 American Basketball Association Championship. South East Texas would lead the ABA in scoring and finish with a 28–4 record. Keathley was named Associate Coach of the Year in 2010.

Bakersfield Jam (NBA D-League)
In 2011 Kevin Keathley briefly served as assistant coach for the Bakersfield Jam of the NBA Development League. Keathley would resign to accept the head coaching position with the Sauk Valley Predators of the Premier Basketball League (PBL).

Sauk Valley Predators (PBL)
Kevin Keathley served as head coach of the Sauk Valley Predators. During the 2011–2012 season, Keathley guided the Predators to the semi-finals of the Premier Basketball League (PBL) playoffs in 2012. The Predators finished the year leading the PBL in team scoring and a 3rd-place finish overall. In 2012, Keathley was selected to serve as coach of the NBA Development Leagues National Try-Out Camp.

Ottawa SkyHawks (NBL Canada)
Keathley was announced as Ottawa SkyHawks first ever head coach prior to the start of the 2013–14 NBL Canada season. After a disappointing 4–3 start to their inaugural season, Keathley was relieved of his duties.

Bowling Green Bandits (ABA)
Keathley was the head coach of the Bowling Green Bandits of the ABA. He led Bowling Green to a 20–3 overall record during the 2014–15 season.

Halifax Hurricanes (NBL Canada)
In 2016 Keathley was hired as the head coach and general manager of the Halifax Hurricanes in the National Basketball League of Canada. However, he would leave the team during the preseason for personal reasons.

Shreveport Mavericks (TBL)
During 2021 season Keathley would serve as an assistant coach for the Shreveport Mavericks.

Non-coaching career
Keathley has written a book on the game of basketball entitled Hardwood Constitution: A Blueprint to Coaching Success, .

References

External links
 Official East Kentucky Miners Bio

Year of birth missing (living people)
Living people
American men's basketball coaches
Bakersfield Jam coaches
Halifax Hurricanes coaches
Continental Basketball Association coaches